Lysiosquilla is a genus of mantis shrimp of the family Lysiosquillidae, containing these species:

Lysiosquilla campechiensis Manning, 1962
Lysiosquilla capensis Hansen, 1895
Lysiosquilla colemani Ahyong, 2001
Lysiosquilla hoevenii (Herklots, 1851)
Lysiosquilla isos Ahyong, 2004
Lysiosquilla manningi Boyko, 2000
Lysiosquilla monodi Manning, 1977
Lysiosquilla panamica Manning, 1971
Lysiosquilla scabricauda (Lamarck, 1818)
Lysiosquilla sulcirostris Kemp, 1913
Lysiosquilla suthersi Ahyong, 2001
Lysiosquilla tredecimdentata Holthuis, 1941

References

Stomatopoda